is a professional Go player.

Biography
Mannami became a professional in 2000 at the age of seventeen, and four years later, she won the Women's Kisei title. She was promoted to 4 dan in 2007.

Promotion record

Titles & runners-up

External links

GoBase Profile
Nihon Ki-in Profile (Japanese)

1983 births
Japanese Go players
Female Go players
Living people